The Irminger Current is a north Atlantic ocean current setting westward off the southwest coast of Iceland. It is composed of relatively warm and saline waters from the eastern North Atlantic that are fed by the North Atlantic Drift. The Irminger Current is part of the North Atlantic subpolar gyre. The current is named after Danish vice-admiral  (1802–1888).

See also 
 Irminger Sea
 Ocean currents
 Oceanic gyres
 Physical oceanography

References

Currents of the Atlantic Ocean